John William Edinburgh Thomas ( May 1, 1847 – December 18, 1899) was an American businessman, educator, and Illinois politician.  Born into slavery in Alabama, he moved to Chicago after the Civil War, where he became a prominent community leader. In 1876 he became the first African American elected to the Illinois General Assembly. Thomas was instrumental in passage of Illinois' first anti-discrimination in public accommodations law, which he introduced in 1885.

Biography
Thomas was born May 1, 1847 in Montgomery, Alabama. During the American Civil War, Thomas defied laws governing slavery, and taught other slaves how to read and write. He became a school teacher in the south before moving to Chicago with his wife and daughter in 1869. In Chicago, he opened a grocery store, started a school for blacks, and became very involved in Olivet Baptist Church, then located in the South Chicago Loop, which would become his constituency. He was elected to the Illinois House of Representatives in 1876.  He served one term but failed to be re-elected in 1878 and 1880. He was admitted to the bar in 1880 and practiced law, while also expanding his holdings in real estate. He was elected again to the Illinois House of Representatives in 1882 and re-elected to a third term in 1884. In 1885, he was one of the 103 House members to support the U. S. Senate candidacy of John A. Logan; a fellow Republican. 
Also in 1885, Thomas introduced the legislation which became Illinois' first law preventing discrimination in public accommodations. He was elected South Town Clerk in 1886 and served a single term. He died December 18, 1899 as one of the wealthiest African-Americans in Chicago.

References

Further reading

1847 births
1899 deaths
19th-century American politicians
African-American state legislators in Illinois
Illinois lawyers
Republican Party members of the Illinois House of Representatives
Politicians from Chicago
Politicians from Montgomery, Alabama
Lawyers from Montgomery, Alabama
19th-century American lawyers
African-American history in Chicago